Samantha Nassolo (born c. 1988), is Ugandan businesswoman and entrepreneur, who is the founder and promoter of Miss Lira Beauty Pageant. She concurrently serves as the manager of Club Angels Royale, a nightclub in the town of Lira, in the Northern Region of Uganda.

Background and education
Nassolo was born in Buganda circa 1988. She attended local elementary and secondary schools. She was admitted to Makerere University Business School, in the Nakawa Division of Kampala the capital and largest city of Uganda. She graduated with a Bachelor of Travel & Tourism Management.

Career
Following her graduation from university, Nassolo found employment as a restaurant manager, in Kampala. As of March 2018, she still serves in that capacity.

Miss Lira Beauty Pageant
Soon upon her arrival at her new work station, Nassolo took notice of the large number of beautiful young women who flocked to her nightclub on a regular basis. On further inquiry, she found out that the majority were school drop-outs.

Nassolo had participated in beauty pageants while in school, and was aware of how empowering that experience felt, and how participation boosted one's self-esteem. Motivated by a desire to help, at least some of the girls, she conceived the idea to start the annual Miss Lira Beauty Pageant. She wrote to corporate sponsors and some responded positively, including the manufactures of Pepsi, Riham soda and Movit skin cream.

The first Miss Lira Beauty Pageant was held in February 2016 at Angels Royale Nightclub, with nine contestants, above the age of 18 years (the age of majority in Uganda). The 2017 competition attracted 17 age-qualified contestants. In 2018, 22 ladies qualified as contestants. However, only six made it into the competition because of multiple withdrawals, as a result of lack of family support.

The pageant has some limited success, with a number of contestants going on to find long-term employment in broadcasting, retail trade and some have gone on to contest and win in other beauty pageants. Many of contestants act as role-models for other young women in the community.

See also
 Aamito Lagum
 Patricia Akello

References

Living people
Ganda people
Ugandan businesspeople
1988 births
Makerere University Business School alumni
People from Central Region, Uganda
Ugandan beauty pageant contestants